Julia Clara Pitt Byrne (nee Busk, christened 6 Jul 1819 – 1894) was a British author of memoirs about celebrities of her time, as well as more serious social commentary.

Biography
She was the second daughter of Hans Busk, and the sister of Hans Busk the younger and Rachel Harriette Busk.  She was also the sister-in-law of Sir Robert Loder, 1st Baronet through her sister Maria Georgiana. She married William Pitt Byrne in 1842, who was owner of The Morning Post and son of Charlotte Dacre. She converted to Catholicism in 1860.

She is best known for the work Flemish Interiors, and her subsequent works were often published under the name of "The Author of Flemish Interiors" rather than her own name, or sometimes as Mrs. William Pitt Byrne.  Other books include Gossip of the Century and Social Hours With Celebrities.  In a more serious vein, Undercurrents Overlooked described abuses in workhouses.

References

External links
 
 
 

1819 births
1894 deaths
19th-century British writers
19th-century British women writers